Provision of housing in rural areas is considered inadequate in the United Kingdom and the United States. Programs funded by government are providing some rural housing in the United States and India.

Rural housing in the United Kingdom
The lack of affordable housing is one of the most critical issues facing rural communities in the UK. This results in people have to move away to find affordable housing, which means that families are separated by distance and are less able to support each other by providing childcare or to do shopping for elderly relatives. Moreover, local services such as schools and shops become increasingly difficult to maintain due to lack of demand, while rural enterprises cannot recruit sufficient workers who live locally. An integrated approach is needed to sustain rural communities.

Rural housing in the United States
The lack of affordable housing in rural areas of the United States continues to be a critical issue and concern. Factors that can affect affordable rents and home ownership opportunities in Rural America include: lower income levels, urban sprawl pushing housing costs up, loss of high paying jobs and lack of access to credit.

Though the American Housing Survey (AHS) "Homeownership rates increased for virtually all racial and ethnic groups, income groups, regions, and rural and urban areas during the 1990s." However, according to the US Housing Market Conditions, 2nd quarter, 2007 report by the United States Department of Housing and Urban Development, "Housing affordability worsened as sales prices of existing homes increased and mortgage interest rates increased. Housing market performance was weak in the second quarter of 2007, with generally falling production levels and weak existing home sales. The exceptions are the increase in new home sales and the slight increase in housing starts. Inventories of new and existing homes available for sale continue at very high levels, with enough houses available to last nearly 8 months. The home ownership rate declined to 68.2 percent in the second quarter of 2007."

Programs that are addressing the needs of rural housing can be seen through the United States Department of Agriculture’s Rural Housing Service. Other assistance is available through the Housing Assistance Council which is a non-profit organisation. In the United States, "the Housing Assistance Council (HAC) has been helping local organizations build affordable homes in rural America since 1971. HAC emphasizes local solutions, empowerment of the poor, reduced dependence, and self-help strategies. HAC assists in the development of both single- and multi-family homes and promotes home-ownership for working low-income rural families through a self-help, "sweat equity" construction method. The Housing Assistance Council offers services to public, non-profit, and private organisations throughout the rural United States. HAC also maintains a special focus on high-need groups and regions: Indian country, the Mississippi Delta, farmworkers, the Southwest border colonias, and Appalachia.”

The United States Department of Agriculture researches and compiles data sources for rural areas of the United States, through the Economic Research Service, as seen in their article, "One in Four Nonmetro Households are Housing Stressed,” where it indicates that, "Of the Nation’s 2,000-plus nonmetropolitan (nonmetro) counties, 302 are defined as housing stressed." It also states, "The principal component of housing stress is high housing expenses relative to income...” The United States Department of Agriculture, National Agricultural Library’s, Rural Information Center’s Housing page also provides additional resources for rural housing within the United States and works with rural communities and citizens to assist them in housing information needs.

Rural housing in India
In India, rural housing is provided through Indira Awaas Yojana, a welfare program of the Government of India.

See also
Affordable housing
American Housing Survey
Rural community development
Rural Housing Service

References

 US Housing Market Conditions, 2nd Quarter, 2007 report by the US Department of Housing and Urban Development, Office of Policy Development and Research.
 One in Four Nonmetro Households are Housing Stressed. Amber Waves. November 2004. US Department of Agriculture, Economic Research Service.

External links

United Kingdom
Affordable Rural housing, DEFRA
Rural Housing Trust
Rural Community Council of Essex

United States
Council for Affordable and Rural Housing
Housing Assistance Council
Rural housing resources, US Department of Agriculture
Rural Housing Service, US Department of Agriculture
US Department of Housing and Urban Development

Housing
Rural economics
Rural community development